William John Edwards (6 July 1929 – May 2014) was a Welsh professional football player and manager. In his playing career he was a full-back.

Playing career
Edwards began his career as an amateur, initially with Cardiff City and then Lovells Athletic, from whom he joined Crystal Palace in June 1949. Over the next ten seasons Edwards was a regular in the Crystal Palace side and made 223 League appearances before moving to Rochdale in June 1959. After 68 appearances for Rochdale, Edwards moved into Non-League football with Ashford Town (Kent), where he also held a coaching position.

Coaching and management career
In February 1963 he became manager of Exeter City, remaining in charge until early 1965.

Edwards was appointed as Torquay United manager in October 1971, a post he held until January 1973. He later returned to Exeter, for a short spell, before becoming assistant manager at Plymouth Argyle. He subsequently served Leeds United as a scout.

References

External links
Jack Edwards at holmesdale.net
Jack Edwards at Nuts and Bolts Archive (Ashford Town)

1929 births
2014 deaths
People from Risca
Sportspeople from Caerphilly County Borough
Footballers from Newport, Wales
Association football fullbacks
Welsh footballers
Cardiff City F.C. players
Lovell's Athletic F.C. players
Crystal Palace F.C. players
Rochdale A.F.C. players
Ashford United F.C. players
English Football League players
Welsh football managers
Exeter City F.C. managers
Torquay United F.C. managers